Nicholas Hugh Bingham (born 19 March 1945 in York) is a British mathematician working in the field of probability theory, stochastic analysis and analysis more generally.

Personal life
Bingham is married to Cecilie (m. 1980). They have 3 children: James (1982), Ruth (1985), and Tom (1993).

He is a competitive runner, with a best marathon time of 2:46:52 in the 1991 Abingdon Marathon, aged 46. He is a member of Barnet and District AC.

Education and career

Bingham is currently a Senior Research Investigator at Imperial College London, and is a Visiting Professor at both the London School of Economics and the University of Liverpool.

After undergraduate studies in mathematics at Trinity College, Oxford, where he achieved a first class honours degree, he was a research student at Churchill College, Cambridge, where he obtained his PhD in 1969 under the supervision of David George Kendall.  In 1996 he also obtained a ScD from the University of Cambridge.

He serves as Associate Editor of Expositiones Mathematicae and Obituaries Editor of the London Mathematical Society.

With C.M. Goldie and J.L. Teugels, Bingham wrote the book Regular Variation; with Rüdiger Kiesel Risk-neutral Valuation: Pricing and Hedging of Financial Derivatives; with J. M. Fry Regression.

References

1945 births
Alumni of Trinity College, Oxford
Alumni of Churchill College, Cambridge
English mathematicians
Living people